Leopoldo Costoli (1850–1908) was an Italian sculptor.

He was born in Florence, Tuscany.  He studied and worked with his father Aristodemo Costoli.

References
Mackay, James, The Dictionary of Sculptors in Bronze, Antique Collectors Club,  Woodbridge, Suffolk  1977

1850 births
1908 deaths
Sculptors from Florence
19th-century Italian sculptors
Italian male sculptors
20th-century Italian sculptors
20th-century Italian male artists
19th-century Italian male artists